Kozlova is a rural locality (a village) in Beloyevskoye Rural Settlement, Kudymkarsky District, Perm Krai, Russia. The population was 11 as of 2010.

Geography 
It is located 27 km north from Kudymkar.

References 

Rural localities in Kudymkarsky District